Pyongyang Sally was an English-speaking woman on North Korean radio stations who broadcast propaganda to U.S. troops during the Korean War.  This was used with other forms of propaganda including air-dropped leaflets.

See also

 Hanoi Hannah
 Lord Haw-Haw
 Propaganda in North Korea
 Seoul City Sue
 Tokyo Rose

References
Walter J. Boyne, Philip Handleman, Brassey's Air Combat Reader, Brassey's, 2001, page 157, retrieved from Google Books, 05-17-2009
Walter J. Boyne, Aces in Command: Fighter Pilots As Combat Leaders, Brassey's, 2001, page 138, retrieved from Google Books, 05-17-2009
SGM Herbert A. Friedman (Ret.); Radio Leaflets During Wartime

North Korean propagandists
North Korean radio presenters
North Korean women radio presenters
Radio controversies
Propaganda radio broadcasts
Korean War
Propaganda in North Korea
Women in war in East Asia
Women in warfare post-1945